Philip Nelson may refer to:

Philip Nelson (Wisconsin politician) (1891–?), Wisconsin state Senator from 1931 to 1943
Philip Nelson (American football) (born 1993), American football player
Philip E. Nelson (born 1935), American food scientist
Philip Nelson-Ward (1866–1937), British Royal Navy officer and courtier
Philip Nelson (antiquarian) (1872–1953), British founder of the Nelson Collection

See also
Phillip Nelson (born 1929), emeritus professor in economics at SUNY Binghamton
Nelson Phillips (1873–1939), Justice of the Texas Supreme Court